The Shire of Jericho was a local government area in central Queensland between the towns of Barcaldine and Emerald.

The major industry in the region is beef production.

History 
The Kargoolnah Division was created on 11 November 1879 as one of 74 divisions around Queensland under the Divisional Boards Act 1879, covering a large area of central Queensland.

With the passage of the Local Authorities Act 1902, Kargoolnah Division became the Shire of Kargoolnah on 31 March 1903. On 1 January 1916, Jericho split away from Kargoolnah and neighbouring areas to become the separate Shire of Jericho.

On 15 March 2008, under the Local Government (Reform Implementation) Act 2007 passed by the Parliament of Queensland on 10 August 2007, the Shire of Barcaldine merged with the Shires of Aramac and Barcaldine to form the Barcaldine Region.

Towns and localities 
The Shire of Jericho included the following settlements:
 Alpha
 Jericho
 Beaufort
 Cudmore
 Dunrobin
 Hobartville
 Pine Hill
 Sedgeford

Chairmen
 1927: E. J. Presland

Population

References

Former local government areas of Queensland
2008 disestablishments in Australia
Populated places disestablished in 2008